

Season summary
Leverkusen dropped a place to third in the final league table. They also impressed on their Champions League debut, reaching the quarter-finals before elimination by eventual champions Real Madrid.

Players

First-team squad
Squad at end of season

Left club during season

Bayer 04 Leverkusen II

Transfers

Out
  Lars Leese -  Barnsley, June, £250,000
  Daniel Schumann -  Freiburg
  Claudio Reyna -  Wolfsburg, loan
  Mike Rietpietsch -  Fortuna Düsseldorf
  Zé Elias -  Inter Milan

References

Notes

Bayer 04 Leverkusen seasons
Bayer 04 Leverkusen